The Bell Springs is a member of the Nugget Sandstone in Wyoming and a formation in Utah. It is a Late Triassic (Norian to Rhaetian) Fossil theropod tracks assigned to Agialopous wyomingensis have been reported from the formation.

The formation composed of very fine grained limy sandstone that is distinguished from upper part of Nugget by presence of red to purple-red shale and lime cemented siltstone in beds less than 0.1 ft thick and by presence of calcareous firmly indurated beds 1-4 ft thick that are ripple laminated and weather to square faced ledges. May correlate with upper part of Chinle Formation.

See also 
 List of dinosaur-bearing rock formations
 List of stratigraphic units with theropod tracks

References

Bibliography 

  
 

Geologic formations of Wyoming
Triassic System of North America
Triassic geology of Wyoming
Norian Stage
Rhaetian Stage
Sandstone formations of the United States
Ichnofossiliferous formations
Paleontology in Wyoming